Sophie Primas (born 7 June 1962 in Saint-Mandé) is a French politician. She represented the 9th constituency of Yvelines in the French National Assembly from 11 June 2010 to 30 September 2011. She has been a member of the French Senate representing the department of Yvelines since 25 September 2011. Formerly a member of the Union for a Popular Movement, she has been one of The Republicans since 2015.

Primas replaced Henri Cuq in the National Assembly in 2010 after his death. She resigned her seat in the assembly after being elected to the Senate in September 2011. Primas was elected mayor of Aubergenville in April 2014. Before being elected mayor, she served as deputy mayor responsible for finances, public markets and sustainable development.

References 

1962 births
Living people
People from Saint-Mandé
Politicians from Île-de-France
Rally for the Republic politicians
Union for a Popular Movement politicians
The Republicans (France) politicians
Deputies of the 13th National Assembly of the French Fifth Republic
French Senators of the Fifth Republic
Senators of Yvelines
Women mayors of places in France
20th-century French women politicians
21st-century French women politicians
Women members of the National Assembly (France)
Women members of the Senate (France)